Petrus Clemens Wilhelmus Maria "Pieter" Bogaers (2 July 1924 –  5 July 2008) was a Dutch politician of the Catholic People's Party (KVP) and later co-founder of the Political Party of Radicals (PPR).

Decorations

References

External links

Official
  Drs. P.C.W.M. (Pieter) Bogaers Parlement & Politiek

1924 births
2008 deaths
Catholic People's Party politicians
Chairmen of the Political Party of Radicals
Commanders of the Order of Orange-Nassau
Dutch autobiographers
Dutch corporate directors
Dutch financial writers
Dutch nonprofit directors
Dutch people of World War II
Dutch political party founders
Dutch Roman Catholics
Dutch trade unionists
Members of the House of Representatives (Netherlands)
Ministers of Housing and Spatial Planning of the Netherlands
Ministers of Transport and Water Management of the Netherlands
People from Amersfoort
People from Cuijk
Political Party of Radicals politicians
Tilburg University alumni
Academic staff of Tilburg University
20th-century Dutch civil servants
20th-century Dutch economists
20th-century Dutch male writers
20th-century Dutch politicians